Immingham (Queens Road) electric railway station would have been a halt on the Grimsby and Immingham Electric Railway, but it never opened to fare paying passengers. Electrified track was laid to the station site and quarterly proving cars ran for nearly twentyfive years, but no revenue-earning car ever travelled to or from the halt.

Overview
The electric railway was built primarily to carry workers between Grimsby and Immingham Dock which the Great Central Railway had built on a greenfield site in a sparsely populated area. The line was built by the Great Central and remained in railway ownership up to closure in 1961. It therefore appeared in railway timetables and it was possible to buy through tickets between any of the stops on the line and anywhere on the national railway network, though there never was any physical connection with any conventional track, nor with the tramways in Grimsby and Cleethorpes.

In modern parlance the vehicles would be described as trams, but they were typically referred to locally as "tramcars", with related things being called names such as "tramcar halt" and "tramcar bridge" with "car" a more common short form than "tram."

Location and facilities
Immingham Town - known locally as "Tramcar Halt" - was situated outside the dock estate in what in 2012 was still open country. It was the nearest point to the line for its two lesser markets - railwaymen travelling to and from Immingham engine shed and residents of the village of Immingham, by far the greatest market being dock workers. The station was nevertheless a third of a mile from the engine shed and a good mile from the village proper.

When the line was proposed it included plans to continue from Immingham Town southwest along Queens Road to a point near the footpath to engine shed, or "Loco" as it was called locally. A 1966 aerial photograph shows a single decker bus in the near foreground very close to where the tramcar halt would have been.

When the line was completed in 1913 the extension was omitted. Influential fingers were wagged so the company grudgingly built it to what would have been Queens Road Halt. The extension was single track with a passing loop at the halt. Proving tramcars ran along the extension every quarter to maintain the right of way, but no revenue earning vehicle ever traversed it. The overhead wires and points were removed in the Second World War and all trace of the unused branch had gone by 1955.

Services
Unusually among British tramways, services ran round the clock, particularly to provide for railway workers based at Immingham engine shed, whose duties often involved starting or finishing at unsocial hours. Traffic was highly peaked, with convoys of tramcars leaving and arriving to match shift changes at the dock. It was normal for several tramcars to queue to reverse at Immingham Town at the peaks.

Herein lay some of the reasons the Great Central never followed through with their stated intention of running cars to Queen Road, still less to Immingham Village beyond, as was implied in some earlier publicity and repeatedly requested by Immingham Parish Council. By a large margin the line's key market was dock workers, with railway staff a distant second and Immingham villagers a distant third. While these last would have paid fares, railway staff never did throughout the line's existence, so running tracks and services would be hopelessly uneconomic. Furthermore, travelling through to Queens Road or the village would have added significant time and potential disruption to the core users' journeys, with no benefit to them whatsoever.

Closure
The line took some years to die, being cut back at the Grimsby end in 1956 then reduced to peak services only in 1959, when it disappeared from Bradshaw and through ticketing beyond the line was withdrawn. Formal closure of the line and Immingham Town tramcar halt came on Monday 3 July 1961, with the last tramcars running on Saturday 1 July 1961, when a convoy of six cars set off from Immingham Dock, nominally at 14:03. The last tramcar of this convoy and therefore the last from Immingham Town was Number 4.

Aftermath
The first track on the line to be removed was at Dock tramcar station, to give increased parking space. The process of demolition was piecemeal and even in 2013 many hints of the line remained, such as spun concrete masts near Immingham Town.

References

Sources

Further material

, contains a fine archive section on the tramway
, solely about the tramways of Immingham, Grimsby & Cleethorpes

External links
Immingham as a green field site before the dock National Library of Scotland
Immingham Town on an inter-War OS map National Library of Scotland
Immingham Queens Road tramcar halt on an OS map surveyed in 1930 National Library of Scotland
The station Rail Map Online
The Grimsby & Immingham Tramway www.lner.info
Tramway photos davesrailpics
The Tramway Local Transport History Soc
Tramway remains Thorne Railway
Tramcar at Immingham Town geograph
The site of the halt from the air Britain from Above

Disused railway stations in the Borough of North East Lincolnshire
Former Great Central Railway stations
1915 establishments in England
Immingham
Railway stations in Great Britain opened in the 20th century